Matt Waletzko (born December 15, 1999) is an American football offensive tackle for the Dallas Cowboys of the National Football League (NFL). He played college football at North Dakota.

Early life
Waletzko grew up in Cold Spring, Minnesota and attended Rocori High School.

College career
Waletzko was a member of the North Dakota Fighting Hawks for four seasons. He played in nine games as a true freshman and started the final five games of the season at left tackle. Waletzko started the first six games of his sophomore season before suffering a season-ending knee injury. He started all seven of UND's games during his junior season, which was shortened and played in the spring of 2021 due to the COVID-19 pandemic in the United States, and was named second-team All-Missouri Valley Football Conference (MVFC). Waletzko started the first ten games of his senior season before missing his final game due to an injury and was named first-team All-MVFC.

Professional career

Waletzko was selected in the fifth round of the 2022 NFL Draft by the Dallas Cowboys. The Cowboys previously obtained the selection in the trade that sent Amari Cooper to the Cleveland Browns. He was placed on injured reserve on October 22, 2022, after suffering a shoulder injury in practice.

References

External links
 Dallas Cowboys bio
 North Dakota Fighting Hawks bio

Living people
American football offensive tackles
North Dakota Fighting Hawks football players
People from Stearns County, Minnesota
Players of American football from Minnesota
Dallas Cowboys players
1999 births